Marcus Warren Haber (born January 11, 1989) is a Canadian professional soccer player who plays as a striker for Cambodian club Preah Khan Reach Svay Rieng.

Haber began his career at local club Vancouver Selects, playing four years with the youth team. In 2006, he joined FC Groningen of the Dutch Eredivisie as a youth player, and spent two years the club's under-19 team. Haber returned to Canada and signed for the Vancouver Whitecaps in February 2009. Named Rookie of the Year in the USL First Division, he then joined Championship club West Bromwich Albion for an undisclosed fee in January 2010. He was soon loaned out for a month to League One club Exeter City. In April 2010, he rejoined Vancouver Whitecaps on loan to play first-team football.

He returned to West Brom ahead of the 2010–11 season, but was loaned out for a third occasion, this time to Scottish Premier League club St Johnstone. Injury disrupted his time with the club, and his loan spell was ended prematurely in November 2010. In July 2011, Haber joined St Johnstone on a permanent basis, signing on a free transfer. After one year with the SPL team, he joined Stevenage on a two-year deal. Haber spent two seasons at Stevenage, also spending time on loan at Notts County during the 2013–14 campaign. He then signed for Crewe Alexandra, also of League One, in July 2014, where he spent two seasons. Haber subsequently signed for Scottish Premiership club Dundee in October 2016. He was loaned to Falkirk of the Scottish Championship for the first half of the 2018–19 season. In January 2019, he signed with Pacific FC of the newly-formed Canadian Premier League, before moving to Cavalry FC a year later. He joined Cambodian C-League club Visakha FC in January 2021.

Haber has also represented the Canada men's national soccer team at under-16, under-17, under-20, under-23, and senior level.

Early life
Born and raised in Vancouver, British Columbia, Haber is the oldest child of David and Carla Haber. He has a brother and a sister. He not only excelled in soccer, but also baseball and basketball, and attended Lord Kitchener Elementary and Lord Byng Secondary schools.

Club career

Early career
Haber began his soccer career by playing for Dunbar SA from 1994 to 2002. He then joined Vancouver Selects in 2002, progressing through the youth academy there, where he helped lead his local team to a national championship in early 2006. He played for the Whitecaps FC Reserves in the Pacific Coast Soccer League in 2006, before travelling to Europe, spending two seasons playing for the under-19 team of FC Groningen of the Dutch Eredivisie. During his time at Groningen, he played regularly for the club's youth team, making over 20 appearances, as well as making two further appearances for the reserve team.

In the summer of 2008, Haber joined English League One club Leeds United on trial, participating in their pre-season tour to Ireland ahead of the 2008–09 season. He made his first appearance for Leeds as a second-half substitute in the club's friendly win over Galway United. Haber made his first start, and scored his first goal, in a 3–2 victory against Bray Wanderers, a game in which Leeds came from two goals down to win. He remained at Leeds on their return to England, with manager Simon Grayson "still showing interest" in the player. However, Leeds did not offer him a contract. After his last game for Leeds against Barnet, Haber began to search for another club.

In August 2008, Haber had an unsuccessful trial with Hartlepool United, where he played in one pre-season friendly away at York City. This was followed by an unsuccessful trial at Rotherham United later that month. In September 2008, Haber spent two weeks on trial at English League Two club Gillingham. He played in two reserve matches against the respective reserve teams of Southampton and Crystal Palace, but was ultimately not offered a contract.

Vancouver Whitecaps
After unsuccessfully searching for a club in Europe, Haber returned to Canada, and subsequently joined the Vancouver Whitecaps on February 11, 2009. He claimed both the 'Newcomer of the Year' and 'Fan's Favourite' awards after a successful first season with the Whitecaps. The striker was one of seven USL First Division players to appear in every regular season match for his club that year, with Whitecaps goalkeeper Jay Nolly being another player to achieve the same feat during the 2009 season. Haber scored his first goal for the club on April 18, 2009, netting in a 2–1 away defeat to the Puerto Rico Islanders. The goal earned Haber a spot in the USL-1 Team of the Week for Week Two. In the Nutrilite Canadian Championship, Haber scored the winning goal in the Whitecaps' 2–0 away win over the Montreal Impact on May 20, 2009, scoring 33 seconds into the match. In doing so, Haber set the record for the quickest goal scored in a Nutrilite Canadian Championship match.

The striker then earned a place in the Team of the Week for Week 14 after claiming a goal and an assist in a 4–0 home win over the Minnesota Thunder on July 9, 2009. Whitecaps finished the season in seventh place, earning a place in the play-offs. Haber scored with his head in both legs of the play-off semi-final series versus Portland Timbers as the Whitecaps advanced to the USL-1 Championship Series final courtesy of a 5–4 aggregate victory. In the first leg of the USL-1 Championship Series, Haber scored in a 3–2 home defeat to Canadian rivals Montreal Impact on October 10, 2009. After the season had ended, Haber was named as Rookie of the Year in the USL First Division for the 2009 season. He scored 12 goals in 39 appearances during the campaign.

West Bromwich Albion
In November 2009, Haber spent four days training with Championship club West Bromwich Albion. After impressing during the trial, Haber signed for West Brom for an undisclosed fee, agreeing to personal terms and passing his medical on January 12, 2010. On joining the club, Haber said that "The club were pretty straightforward with me from day one. They said that if I was given the opportunity, they would work to improve me as a young player". He was given a squad number of 40.

Loan spells
Having made just two reserve appearances for West Brom due to a spate of postponements because of adverse weather conditions, Haber moved to League One club Exeter City on a month-long loan deal on February 18, 2010, to gain first-team experience. He made his debut for Exeter in the club's 1–0 home defeat to Stockport County two days after signing, coming on as a 60th-minute substitute in the match. He went on to make five appearances during the brief loan agreement, before returning to West Brom in March 2010.

After just four months in England, Haber returned to Canada, rejoining Vancouver Whitecaps on April 9, 2010, on a two-month loan deal. West Brom believed the loan move would enable Haber to get more game time  — "Marcus joined us in January but it took around a month for international clearance to be granted and then several reserves fixtures were called off due to the bad weather. This meant he only played a game or two for us during his first two and a half months in England. That's why we've allowed Marcus to rejoin Vancouver, so he can get as much game time as possible". During his loan spell back in Vancouver, Haber made 15 appearances in all competitions, scoring twice.

St Johnstone
Ahead of the 2010–11 season, Haber was loaned out for a third time, joining Scottish Premier League team St Johnstone on a season-long loan. On signing Haber for the season, St Johnstone manager Derek McInnes stated — "West Brom have high hopes for him but having stepped up a level into the Premiership they wanted him to go out on loan rather than be kicking his heels at The Hawthorns. He is young, hungry, has real pace and he's keen to learn". A day later, he played in Alan Main's testimonial match, against a Manchester United XI. Haber made his competitive debut for the club in a 1–1 draw against Hearts on August 14, 2010, playing the opening 72 minutes of the match. He scored his first goal for the club on September 21, 2010, as he ran onto Alan Maybury's pass to score as St Johnstone beat Queen of the South 3–0 in the Scottish League Cup. After making 14 appearances, and scoring twice, during the first three months of the season, Haber snapped his anterior cruciate ligament in a 3–0 home defeat to Kilmarnock on November 6, 2010, turning "awkwardly on the slick McDiarmid Park surface" in "an innocuous incident". He returned to West Brom to undergo surgery, with the injury ultimately ruling Haber out for the remainder of the season.

Released by West Brom on July 4, 2011, having made no first-team appearances for the club, Haber signed a one-year deal with St Johnstone on July 22, 2011. Haber had spent two weeks on trial with the club prior to the transfer being made permanent. He made his first appearance of the 2011–12 campaign in the club's first match of the season, coming on as a second-half substitute in a 0–0 away draw against Aberdeen. After appearing predominantly as a substitute during the early months of the season, Haber scored his first goal in a 3–1 victory over Hibernian on November 26, 2011. He went on to score one further goal during the season, a late consolation strike as St Johnstone were beaten 2–1 at home to Aberdeen on December 13, 2011. During the season, Haber made 34 appearances in all competitions, scoring two goals, as St Johnstone finished the season in sixth position.

Stevenage
Haber signed for League One club Stevenage on a free transfer on July 4, 2012, and on a two-year contract. He made his debut in the club's first game of the 2012–13 season, a 3–1 home victory over AFC Wimbledon in the League Cup on August 14, 2012, assisting two goals in the game. Haber scored his first goal for the club in a televised 2–1 victory against Coventry City  at the Ricoh Arena, coming on as a second-half substitute and scoring the winning goal with a header fifteen minutes from time. Haber went on to score twice in February 2013, both of which were headed goals, in games against Notts County and Carlisle United respectively. Haber's seventh goal of the season came in Stevenage's important 1–0 win over Brentford on March 5, 2013, with the goal ensuring Stevenage ended a six-game losing streak. It proved to be Haber's last goal of the campaign, as he made 46 appearances in all competitions during his first season with the club. In May 2013, Haber was one of three players placed on the transfer list, with the player entering the final year of his contract at Stevenage. New manager Graham Westley felt Haber would not play regularly the following season, and therefore it was "better for all" that he "move on to develop his career". In September 2013, Haber joined divisional rivals Notts County on a three-month emergency loan agreement.

Crewe Alexandra
He signed for Crewe Alexandra on July 31, 2014. After playing 82 games in all competitions and scoring 18 goals, he was released in May 2016.

Dundee
In October 2016, Haber went on trial with Dundee, and on October 24, he signed a deal to the end of the season. He made his debut for the club on October 26, 2016, in a 2–0 home defeat to Partick Thistle and scored his first goal for the club in a 2–0 home win against Motherwell on November 5, 2016. On January 19, 2017, Haber signed a new two-year contract.

Haber was loaned to Scottish Championship club Falkirk in July 2018. Haber's loan would be cut short by Falkirk, and Haber would leave Dundee by mutual consent in January 2019.

Pacific FC
Haber signed with Canadian Premier League club Pacific FC on January 9, 2019. On April 29, 2019 he made his debut in the club's inaugural match. On May 18, 2019 he scored his first goal for Pacific in a 2–2 draw with York 9 FC.

Cavalry FC
In July 2020, Haber signed with Cavalry FC. He made his debut for Cavalry on August 13 in the 2020 season opener against Forge FC. He scored his first goal for his new club in the next game, netting the opener against Valour FC in an eventual 2–0 victory on August 15. Haber would go on to score again in a crucial 1-0 victory against York 9 FC on Sept 5. After the 2020 season, Haber and the club would mutually agree to part ways, allowing Haber to pursue an opportunity overseas.

Visakha
On January 18, 2021, Haber signed with Cambodian C-League club Visakha FC. Haber would make his debut for his new club on May 15th adding an assist in a 1-1 draw to National Police Commissary FC. He would score his first goal for Visakha on July 3rd in a 2-2 draw against Nagaworld FC. In the following match on July 10th, Haber would set a new club record, scoring 4 goals in a 9-0 rout over Asia Euro United.  Haber finished the season as Visakha's top scorer with 17 goals and added 10 assists. Shortly after the end of the season it was confirmed that Haber would depart the club.

Preah Khan Reach Svay Rieng
On January 16, 2022, it was announced that Haber had signed with Cambodian Premier League club Preah Khan Reach Svay Rieng FC.

International career
Haber has represented Canada from the U15 through to the U23 Olympic levels. He appeared in all three games in the 2007 FIFA U20 World Cup, although he was played in an unfamiliar role as a centre-back. In March 2008, Haber made three Olympic qualification appearances in Canada's unsuccessful campaign to reach the 2008 Men's Olympic Football Tournament in Beijing. He was a member of Canada's U20 squad that did not qualify for the 2009 FIFA U20 World Cup in Egypt, finishing third in their group. As a result, Canada did not qualify for the Championship round. In March 2012, Haber was once again part of the U23 squad that would attempt to qualify for the Summer Olympics later that year. Canada qualified from the group stage, finishing in second place with five points, qualifying at the expense of the United States U23 side after securing a surprise 2–0 victory over them. Haber played in two out of the three group matches. They lost in the semi-final stage to the eventual gold medal side, going down 3–1 to their Mexican counterparts, with Haber scoring Canada's solitary goal to briefly restore parity in the match.

Haber made his debut for the senior side in a 2–2 friendly against Ukraine at the Valeriy Lobanovskyi Dynamo Stadium on October 8, 2010, coming on as a 73rd-minute substitute for Olivier Occéan. In August 2011, he was called up for Canada's two 2014 World Cup qualifiers the following month. He appeared as a late substitute in Canada's 4–1 victory over Saint Lucia on September 3, 2011, although he was an unused substitute four days later as Canada defeated Puerto Rico 3–0, in-turn securing qualification to the third round. Haber earned his third senior cap in February 2012, when he replaced Julian de Guzman in the 82nd minute as Canada lost 3–1 in a friendly match against Armenia in Limassol. In March 2013, he was named in the 21-man senior squad for friendly fixtures against Japan and Belarus, with both games taking place in Doha, Qatar. Haber made his first start for Canada in the match against Japan  on March 22, a 2–1 defeat, with Haber scoring his first senior goal courtesy of a second-half header from Will Johnson's corner, briefly restoring parity in the match. He also came on as a second-half substitute in Canada's 2–0 loss to Belarus just three days later, earning his fifth senior cap in the process.

In June 2013, Haber was listed for Colin Miller's Canada squad in the 2013 CONCACAF Gold Cup.

Personal life
Haber enjoys listening to, and producing, hip hop music in his spare time. The footballer he most enjoyed watching in his prime was Thierry Henry.

Career statistics

Club

A.  The "League" column constitutes appearances and goals (including those as a substitute) in the USL First Division, D2 Pro League, SPL, Scottish Premiership, EFL, CPL and C-League.
B.  The "Other" column constitutes appearances and goals (including those as a substitute) in the Football League Trophy, Scottish Challenge Cup and play-offs.

International

International goals
Scores and results list Canada's goal tally first.

Honours
Individual
 British Columbia Soccer Association (BCSA) Youth Player of the Year: 2006
 BC Premier's Athletic Award: 2007
 USL First Division Rookie of the Year: 2009
Cambodian Premier League Golden Boot: 2022
Cambodian Premier League Player Of The Season: 2022

References

External links

1989 births
Living people
Association football forwards
Canadian soccer players
Soccer players from Vancouver
Canadian people of Austrian descent
Canadian expatriate soccer players
Expatriate footballers in the Netherlands
Expatriate footballers in England
Expatriate footballers in Scotland
Expatriate footballers in Cambodia
Canadian expatriate sportspeople in the Netherlands
Canadian expatriate sportspeople in England
Canadian expatriate sportspeople in Scotland
FC Groningen players
Vancouver Whitecaps (1986–2010) players
West Bromwich Albion F.C. players
Exeter City F.C. players
St Johnstone F.C. players
Stevenage F.C. players
Notts County F.C. players
Crewe Alexandra F.C. players
Dundee F.C. players
Falkirk F.C. players
Pacific FC players
Cavalry FC players
Preah Khan Reach Svay Rieng FC players
USL First Division players
USSF Division 2 Professional League players
English Football League players
Scottish Premier League players
Scottish Professional Football League players
Canadian Premier League players
Canada men's youth international soccer players
Canada men's under-23 international soccer players
Canada men's international soccer players
2013 CONCACAF Gold Cup players
2015 CONCACAF Gold Cup players